The Akademik Sergey Vavilov is a Russian (formerly Soviet) research vessel, named after physicist Sergey Vavilov. She was completed on 12 February 1988, at the Hollming Yard in Rauma, Finland for the Soviet Union. Akademik Sergey Vavilov started operations as a research vessel of Shirshov Institute of Oceanology of the USSR Academy of Science (Russian Academy of Science since 1991) in the USSR on 20 March 1989, and prior to 7 November 1999, completed five research cruises into Norwegian Sea, North Atlantic Ocean and South Atlantic Ocean.

In recent times she has served as cruise ship specializing in Polar cruises. She is managed by International Shipping Partners and her current port of registry is Kaliningrad, Russia.

She has a sister ship, Akademik Ioffe, completed at Hollming in 1989. Both ships were chartered by One Ocean Expeditions until 2019.

References

External links

Research vessels of Russia
Research vessels of the Soviet Union
Ships built in Rauma, Finland
Finland–Soviet Union relations
Expedition cruising
1988 ships